Fantastic Animation Festival is a package film of animation segments, set mostly to music and released to theaters in 1977. It was one of the earliest of the sort of collections typified by Computer Animation Festival and Spike and Mike's Sick and Twisted Festival of Animation (the co-founders of the latter, formerly known as Festival of Animation, send out flyers of Fantastic Animation Festival).

Summary
Included in its original form of 16 segments were the first national appearance of Will Vinton's Claymation (Closed Mondays and Mountain Music), Bambi Meets Godzilla, Cat Stevens' animated promo for his song Moonshadow that was shown at his early concerts, and a previously seen Max Fleischer Superman cartoon from the 1940s (The Mechanical Monsters).  The original running time was 107 minutes, which was later edited down to 90 minutes, and then edited for television, to 80 minutes.

Segments
(The following are in running order.)
"Welcome to the world of animation" introduction; voice-over by Paul Frees who also narrated the trailer 
French Windows; rotoscope animation to Pink Floyd's "One of These Days" by Ian Eames
Icarus; Romanian clay animation by Mihail Badica
A Short History of the Wheel; by Loren Bowie
Cosmic Cartoon; Animated and directed by Eric Ladd and Steven Lisberger
The Last Cartoon Man; by Derek Lamb & Jeffrey Hale
Au Bout Du Fil Cradle (Cat's Cradle); by Paul Driessen (National Film Board of Canada)
Moonshadow; Cat Stevens' story of Teaser and the Firecat, narrated by Spike Milligan, by Charles Jenkins
Oiseau de Nuit (Nightbird); by Bernard Palacios 
Room and Board; by Randy Cartwright 
Bambi Meets Godzilla; by Marv Newland
Mountain Music; Claymation by Will Vinton
Light; by Jordan Belson
The Mechanical Monsters; a public domain 1941 Fleischer Studios cartoon
Stranger; a 1971 Levi Strauss Jeans commercial; by Snazelle Films, narrated by Ken Nordine
Uncola; a 1975 7Up commercial; by Robert Abel and Associates
Mirror People; by Kathy Rose 
Kick Me; by Robert Swarthe, a 1975 Best Animated Short Film nominee
Closed Mondays; Claymation by Will Vinton and Bob Gardiner (1974 Academy Award Winner for Best Animated Short Film)

See also
International Tournee of Animation
Animation Show of Shows
The Animation Show

Notes
The 1941 Academy Award-nominated Superman (AKA The Mad Scientist) was featured on the TV version while the episode ended with Mirror People instead of Closed Mondays.

Soundtrack
The fanfare music was done by Richard Audd.

References

External links

 Fantastic Animation Festival on The Internet Archive
 Fantastic Animation Festival on AllMovie

1977 films
1977 animated films
American anthology films
Compilation films
American animated films
1970s in animation
1970s English-language films
Animated anthology films
1970s American films